The Statute of the International Court of Justice is an integral part of the United Nations Charter, as specified by Chapter XIV of the United Nations Charter, which established the International Court of Justice (replacing the Permanent Court of International Justice).

Structure 
The Statute is divided into 5 chapters and consists of 70 articles. The Statute begins with Article 1 proclaiming:

The 69 Articles are grouped in 5 Chapters:

Chapter I: Organization of the Court (Articles 2 - 33)
Chapter II: Competence of the Court (Articles 34 - 38)
Chapter III: Procedure (Articles 39 - 64)
Chapter IV: Advisory Opinions (Articles 65 - 68)
Chapter V: Amendment (Articles 69 & 70)

Article 38.1 lists sources that the court may apply to decide a case, including: treaties, customary international law, general principles of law, and (as subsidiary means) judicial decisions and academic writing. These sources are qualified by Article 59 which states that ICJ decisions are binding only to the parties in that case, and Article 38.2 which allows the court to decide a case ex aequo et bono if the parties agree thereto.

Parties to the Statute

All  UN member states are parties to the Statute by virtue of their ratification of the UN Charter.  Under Article 93(2) of the UN Charter, states which are not a member of the UN may become a party to the Statute, subject to the recommendation of the United Nations Security Council and approval of the United Nations General Assembly.  As of 2015, neither the UN General Assembly non-member observer states, namely the State of Palestine and the Holy See, nor any other states are parties to the statute under these provisions.  Switzerland (1948-2002), Liechtenstein (1950-1990), San Marino (1954-1992), Japan (1954-1956), and Nauru (1988-1999) were all parties to the Statute prior to becoming UN member states.

References

External links

Statute of the International Court of Justice.
 Procedural history note and audiovisual material on the Statute of the International Court of Justice in the Historic Archives of the United Nations Audiovisual Library of International Law

Divisions and sections of the Charter of the United Nations